The Monument to F. E. Dzerzhinsky is a monument to Felix Dzerzhinsky established in Taganrog in 1987 at the end of Dzerzhinsky Street at departure on Privokzalnaya Square.

History 

The sculptor is A. D. Scherbakov, the architect — P. V. Bondarenko.

In Taganrog Felix Dzerzhinsky was not though his father, Edmund Iosifovich Dzerzhinsky taught several years mathematics in the Taganrog classical men's gymnasium.

At the same time, certain relations connect Taganrog and F.E. Dzerzhinsky: he saved in 1922 Taganrog Metallurgical Works from closing. The Yugostal trust to which Taganrog Metallurgical Works submitted in 1922 decided that restoration of the plant is impossible and it is unsuitable to further work. Dismantling of the equipment was begun, and only intervention of the chairman of VSNKh of the USSR Dzerzhinsky saved the plant from elimination.

The ceremonial opening of a monument was held on November 5, 1987.

References 

Tourist attractions in Taganrog
Cultural heritage monuments in Taganrog
Monuments and memorials in Taganrog
Busts in Russia
Cultural heritage monuments of regional significance in Rostov Oblast